Incarnate Word Academy is a private, Roman Catholic high school in Corpus Christi, Texas.  It is located in the Roman Catholic Diocese of Corpus Christi.

Background
Incarnate Word was established as an all-girls school in March of 1871 by the Sisters of the Incarnate Word and Blessed Sacrament. It moved to its current location in 1955. The high school became coeducational in 1975. Today, Incarnate Word Academy is home to the 2006–07 and 2007-08 Academic State Champions, as well as the 2006–07, 2007–08, and 2008–09 Cross Country State Champions.

Notes and references

External links
  School Website
 Roman Catholic Diocese of Corpus Christi

Catholic secondary schools in Texas
Educational institutions established in 1871
High schools in Corpus Christi, Texas
Private K-12 schools in Texas
1871 establishments in Texas